The 2018 Biathlon Junior World Championships was held in Otepää, Estonia from 26 February to 4 March 2018. There was a total of 16 competitions: sprint, pursuit, individual and relay races for men and women.

Schedule
All times are local (UTC+2).

Medal winners

Junior events

Junior Men

Junior Women

Youth events

Youth Men

Youth Women

Medal table

References

External links
IBU 

Biathlon Junior World Championships
2018 in biathlon
2018 in Estonian sport
International sports competitions hosted by Estonia
2018 in youth sport
Otepää Parish
February 2018 sports events in Europe
March 2018 sports events in Europe